Artur Andreyevich Lesko (Artur Lyasko, ; born 25 April 1984) is a Belarusian former football goalkeeper.

Honours
Dinamo Minsk
Belarusian Premier League champion: 2004

Pyunik Yerevan
Armenian Premier League champion: 2010
Armenian Independence Cup winner: 2010

Minsk
Belarusian Cup winner: 2012–13

References

External links

1984 births
Living people
People from Baranavichy
Sportspeople from Brest Region
Belarusian footballers
Association football goalkeepers
Belarusian expatriate footballers
Expatriate footballers in Ukraine
Belarusian expatriate sportspeople in Ukraine
Expatriate footballers in Armenia
Ukrainian Premier League players
Armenian Premier League players
FC RUOR Minsk players
FC Dinamo-Juni Minsk players
FC Dinamo Minsk players
FC Kryvbas Kryvyi Rih players
FC Pyunik players
FC Minsk players
FC Slutsk players
FC Gomel players
FC Torpedo Minsk players
FC Baranovichi players
FC Lida players
FC Energetik-BGU Minsk players